Uraeotyphlus malabaricus is a species of caecilian in the family Ichthyophiidae. It is endemic to the Western Ghats of India and is known from its type locality, "Malabar" in Kerala, and from the Nilgiri mountains in Tamil Nadu. It is known with several common names: Malabar tailed caecilian, Nilgiris caecilian, Malabar caecilian, and white-lipped caecilian.

Description
Adult measure  including the  tail. The body is short and stout, violet-coloured dorsally and lighter ventrally. The eyes are distinct and surrounded by a light ring. The tentacles are placed ventrally, close to the lip. Light-coloured areas are present around the nostrils, snout tip, and tentacles. The upper lips and lower jaw are also of a light cream colour. There is a light spot present near vent, and the tip of the tail is whitish.

Habitat and conservation
Uraeotyphlus malabaricus has been collected in evergreen tropical forest ( above sea level), but its ecology is generally poorly known. Presumably, the adults are fossorial. It is probably an oviparous species laying terrestrial eggs and having aquatic larvae.

Threats to this species are not known. It occurs in the Kalakkad Mundanthurai Tiger Reserve.

References

malabaricus
Amphibians of India
Endemic fauna of the Western Ghats
Taxa named by Richard Henry Beddome
Amphibians described in 1870